Bishop Arthur George Riddell (born 15 September 1836, York – died 1907, England, UK) was the Roman Catholic Bishop of Northampton from 1880 until his death in 1907.

On 24 September 1858, aged 22, he was ordained a priest for the Diocese of Beverley at Ushaw in County Durham by Bishops Robert Cornthwaite, Francis Kerril Amherst and Richard Lacy.

On 27 April 1880, aged 43, he was appointed as Bishop of Northampton and ordained two months later on 9 June 1880.

He died in 1907, aged 71. He had been a priest for 49 years and a bishop for 27 years. Riddell is buried at The Cathedral Church of St Mary and St Thomas.

References

External links
Catholic Hierarchy

1836 births
1907 deaths
19th-century Roman Catholic bishops in England
20th-century Roman Catholic bishops in England
Roman Catholic bishops of Northampton